The Poet Laureate of Kansas is the poet laureate for the U.S. state of Kansas. The program is managed by the Kansas Creative Arts Industries Commission.

List of Poets Laureate
 Jonathan Holden (2005-2007)
 Denise Low (2007-2009)
 Caryn Mirriam-Goldberg (2009-2013)
 Wyatt Townley (2013-2015)
 Eric McHenry (2015-2017)
 Kevin Rabas (2017-2019)
 Huascar Medina (2019-present)

See also

 Poet laureate
 List of U.S. states' poets laureate
 United States Poet Laureate

References

 
Kansas culture
American Poets Laureate